Ochrodota is a genus of moths in the family Erebidae.

Species
Ochrodota affinis
Ochrodota atra
Ochrodota brunnescens
Ochrodota constellata
Ochrodota funebris
Ochrodota grisescens
Ochrodota marina
Ochrodota pronapides
Ochrodota similis
Ochrodota tessellata

References
Natural History Museum Lepidoptera generic names catalog

Phaegopterina
Moth genera